WHAN is an adult album alternative formatted broadcast radio station licensed to Ashland, Virginia, serving Ashland and Hanover County, Virginia as well as the northern half of the Metro Richmond, Virginia region.  WHAN is owned by Stu-Comm, Inc. WHAN currently simulcasts WNRN.

History
On February 1, 2015, Charlottesville-based public broadcaster WTJU began simulcasting its programming on WHAN in an attempt to use its FM translator to reach the Richmond market.

WTJU terminated the local marketing agreement effective August 16, 2017, citing financial reasons. WHAN returned to a locally programmed music format, branded "102.9 The Mater", which it described as a mix of classic Southern rock and 1990s alternative rock but has transitioned since 2018 to "The RVA's Best Music Variety" featuring artists and genres from the past 65 years.

On August 10, 2020, Fifth Estate Broadcasting filed an agreement to donate WHAN and W275BQ to Stu-Comm, Inc., operator of Charlottesville-based adult album alternative station WNRN, which complements its existing Richmond pair of WFTH (1590 AM) and W203CB (88.5 FM). This action came less than a week after the Federal Communications Commission (FCC) repealed a longstanding rule that prevented co-owned AM stations with overlapping signals from broadcasting the same programming. The sale was completed on October 9, 2020. WHAN and W275BQ now simulcast WNRN.

Translator
In addition to the main station, WHAN is relayed by an FM translator to replicate the daytime signal of 1430 AM on the FM dial 24 hours a day.

References

External links
 WHAN Online

1962 establishments in Virginia
Adult album alternative radio stations in the United States
Community radio stations in the United States
Radio stations established in 1962
HAN